St. Mary's Catholic Church is Catholic parish of the Diocese of Sioux Falls located in Salem, South Dakota. Its historic church, at Vermont and Idaho Streets, was added to the National Register in 1985.

The community was established in 1885 by Martin Marty, the Vicar Apostolic of Dakota, and the first church was dedicated on November 10, 1887. The cornerstone for the new stone church was laid on July 4, 1898, and the current Gothic Revival structure opened the following year.

The school opened in 1889 and moved to a new building in 1901. The parish also sponsored a high school from 1929 to 1970.

References

External links
 St. Mary's Catholic Church website

Churches in the Roman Catholic Diocese of Sioux Falls
Churches on the National Register of Historic Places in South Dakota
Gothic Revival church buildings in South Dakota
Roman Catholic churches completed in 1898
Religious organizations established in 1885
Buildings and structures in McCook County, South Dakota
1898 establishments in South Dakota
National Register of Historic Places in McCook County, South Dakota
19th-century Roman Catholic church buildings in the United States